WKOS (104.9 FM), branded as "104.9 Nash Icon", is a radio station serving the Tri-Cities, Tennessee, area with country music. This station is under ownership of Cumulus Media.

History
This station was WGAT-FM Mar. 13, 1979, WZXY on Oct. 14, 1981, and changed to its current call letters on July 1, 1991.
In 1967, the phone hacker Captain Crunch created a radio station called WKOS [W-"chaos"], a pirate station in nearby Dover-Foxcroft, but had to shut it down when a legitimate radio station, WDME, objected.
 the format was an Oldies under their new call letter WKOS, the new slogan was "Good Times Great Oldies! Oldies 104.9, WKOS". 

On February 24, 2012, WKOS changed their format to country, branded as "The New Great Country 104.9 WKOS".

On July 3, 2013, at 3:00 pm EDT WKOS re-branded itself as "The New Nash FM 104.9".

And then on April 24, 2015, WKOS rebranded as "Nash Icon 104.9".

Sports coverage
In 2007, the East Tennessee State University men's basketball Team moved its games from WJCW to WKOS. This marked the first time the team was heard on FM radio. This has since been moved to AM 640 WXSM, a sister station.

Previous logo
  (WKOS's logo under previous "Nash FM" branding)

References

External links
WKOS official website

A commercial for WZXY ("Y-105") from 1982
One of the commercials for WZXY, as a Top 40 station

KOS
Country radio stations in the United States
Cumulus Media radio stations